Longueuil—Saint-Hubert (formerly Longueuil—Pierre-Boucher and Longueuil) is a federal electoral district in Quebec, Canada, represented in the House of Commons of Canada from since 2015

Geography
This South Shore district in the Quebec region of Montérégie includes the eastern part of the City of Longueuil.

The neighbouring ridings are Longueuil—Charles-LeMoyne, Montarville, Pierre-Boucher—Les Patriotes—Verchères, La Pointe-de-l'Île, and Hochelaga.

Demographics
According to the Canada 2016 Census
 Twenty most common mother tongue languages (2016) :  83.5% French, 3.5% English, 3.1% Spanish, 2.1% Arabic, 1.0% Creole languages, 0.7% Romanian, 0.6% Farsi, 0.5% Portuguese, 0.5% Italian, 0.5% Russian, 0.5% Vietnamese, 0.4% Mandarin, 0.3% Kabyle, 0.2% Cantonese, 0.2% Greek, 0.1% Polish, 0.1% Ukrainian, 0.1% Bulgarian, 0.1% German, 0.1% Lao, 0.1% Wolof

History
The electoral district was created as "Longueuil" in 1952 from parts of Chambly—Rouville and Châteauguay—Huntingdon—Laprairie ridings. It was renamed "Longueuil—Pierre-Boucher" in 2004.

This riding was largely replaced with "Longueuil—Saint-Hubert", losing territory to Pierre-Boucher—Les Patriotes—Verchères and gaining territory from Saint-Bruno—Saint-Hubert during the 2012 electoral redistribution.

Members of Parliament

This riding has elected the following Members of Parliament:

Election results

Longueuil—Saint-Hubert, 2015–present

Longueuil—Pierre-Boucher, 2004–2015

Longueuil, 1952–2004

Note: Conservative vote is compared to the total of the Canadian Alliance vote and Progressive Conservative vote in the 2000 election.

	

Note: Social Credit vote is compared to Ralliement créditiste vote in the 1968 election.

Note: Ralliement créditiste vote is compared to Social Credit vote in the 1963 election.

Note: New Democratic Party vote is compared to Co-operative Commonwealth Federation vote in the 1958 election.

See also
 List of Canadian federal electoral districts
 Past Canadian electoral districts
 Pierre Boucher

References

Campaign expense data from Elections Canada
Results from Elections Canada
Riding history from the Library of Parliament
Longueuil—Pierre-Boucher, Quebec (2004 - )

Notes

Politics of Longueuil
Quebec federal electoral districts